Asthenotricha ansorgei is a moth in the family Geometridae first described by William Warren in 1899. It is found in Equatorial Guinea (Bioko), Ethiopia, Kenya, Tanzania and Uganda.

References

Moths described in 1899
Asthenotricha
Moths of Africa